Achiasterella is a genus of scleritophoran known from the Burgess Shale and earlier (Branchian) deposits, and originally described as Chancelloria by Walcott.  The species may represent form taxa rather than true species.

References

Burgess Shale fossils
Enigmatic prehistoric animal genera
Cambrian genus extinctions
Paleozoic life of Newfoundland and Labrador